A cot is a camp bed or infant bed.

Cot or COT may also refer to:

In arts and entertainment
 Chicago Opera Theater, an opera company

In mathematics, science, and technology
 Car of Tomorrow, a car design used in NASCAR racing
 Cost of transport, an energy calculation
 Cottage developed from the word cot, which can be seen in various forms in other languages meaning a tent / hut e.g. Goahti and Kohte 
 Cotangent, a trigonometric function, written as "cot"
 Cyclooctatetraene, an unsaturated hydrocarbon
 Finger cot, a hygienic cover for a single finger

In government and military use
 Colombian Time, the time zone used in Colombia (UTC−05:00)
 Comando de Operações Táticas, a Brazilian counter-terrorism force
 Commitments of Traders Report, US market report
 Committee on Toxicity of Chemicals in Food, Consumer Products and the Environment, in the UK
 RAF Cottesmore Flying Training Unit, United Kingdom (ICAO airline designator)

People
 Cot (surname)
 Cot Deal (1923–2013), American baseball pitcher and coach

Other uses
 Coatesville station, Amtrak station code
 Cot Valley, Cornwall, England
 Cottingley railway station, National Rail station code
 Malbec grapes, known in the Loire Valley as Côt
 Club Olympique des Transports, a football club based in Tunis, Tunisia

See also
 COTS (disambiguation)
 C0t analysis, a biochemical technique
 Khat, a drug